Tajik League is the top division of the Tajikistan Football Federation, it was created in 1992.  These are the statistics of the Tajik League in the 1993 season.

Table

Sources
https://www.rsssf.org/tablest/taji93.html

Tajikistan Higher League seasons
1
Tajik
Tajik